Charles Raymond White (January 22, 1958 – January 11, 2023) was an American professional football player who was a running back in the National Football League (NFL) for nine seasons during the 1980s.

White played college football for the University of Southern California, where he was an All-American and the winner of the Heisman Trophy. A first-round pick (27th overall) in the 1980 NFL Draft, he played professionally for the Cleveland Browns and the Los Angeles Rams of the NFL.

Early life
White was born in Los Angeles, California.  He graduated from San Fernando High School in San Fernando, California, where as a track and field athlete he won the 330 yard low hurdles at the CIF California State Meet over future Olympic Gold medalist Andre Phillips.  He was also a standout high school football player.

College career
White attended the University of Southern California, where he played for the USC Trojans football team.  In 1978, White won the W.J. Voit Memorial Trophy as the outstanding college football player on the Pacific Coast.  In 1979, he received the Heisman Trophy, Maxwell Award, Walter Camp Award, and was named UPI Player of the Year.  He is the second player in Rose Bowl history (of four, total) to have been honored as Player of the Game twice (1979 and 1980).

College statistics

* Includes bowl games.

Professional career
White was selected in the 1st round, 27th overall pick in the 1980 NFL Draft by the Cleveland Browns. After four disappointing seasons in Cleveland, where he rushed for a total of 942 yards and had a 3.4 yards per carry average, White was released before the start of the 1985 season.  White later acknowledged that he struggled with cocaine addiction during this period.

After his release from the Browns in 1985, he reunited with his college coach, John Robinson, who was then coaching the Los Angeles Rams. White would play for the Rams for four seasons, 1985 to 1988. In 1987, he rushed for a league-leading 1,387 yards and 11 touchdowns, which earned him a Pro Bowl selection and the NFL Comeback Player of the Year Award.

White finished his NFL career with 3,075 rushing yards, and 23 rushing touchdowns, along with 114 receptions, 860 yards, and one receiving touchdown.

Post-playing career
In 1993, White joined USC as running backs coach; he later worked as a computer consultant.

In its third and fourth seasons, American Gladiators held special "Pro Football Challenge of Champions" shows. White participated in and won both, each time coming from behind in the "Eliminator" thanks to slip-ups by his opponents. He also competed in sixth season's USC vs. Notre Dame alumni special where he also won, giving him a 3-0 record on the show.

Personal life and drug use
During his years at USC, White struggled with cocaine and marijuana use.  In a 1987 Sports Illustrated article, he admitted to smoking marijuana daily at USC and snorted his first line of cocaine a few weeks before the 1977 Rose Bowl.  He met fellow USC student Judi McGovern and the two dated throughout their time at USC, eventually marrying and having a daughter.  However, White continued his cocaine use through college and on into his early NFL career with the Browns.  White checked into drug rehab in 1982 and was clean for three years.  Even so, the Browns cut him in 1985 and he was picked up on waivers by the Los Angeles Rams, where he was reunited with John Robinson, his former college coach at USC.

White soon had a short relapse into cocaine, but got clean again until one night in August 1987, where he and a friend did lines until White was arrested.  However, Robinson bailed him out of jail and agreed to keep him on the team if he stayed clean.  White responded with the best season of his career in the strike-affected 1987 season, running for 339 yards in the three "scab games" after the Rams traded Eric Dickerson and then for 100 yards in five straight games afterwards.

White and McGovern eventually divorced.  White sold his 1979 Heisman trophy in 2008 to settle tax debts.  White had five children, three daughters and two sons.

A Los Angeles Times article on July 17, 2022, by Bill Plaschke describes White's struggles with dementia and how he was living in an Orange County, California assisted living facility as of 2022.  White could still recall his football days, but had issues with day-to-day functioning; the signs were that his dementia was caused by his career playing football.

White died of liver cancer on January 11, 2023, at the age of 64.

See also
 List of college football yearly rushing leaders

References

External links
 
 
 

1958 births
2023 deaths
American football running backs
Cleveland Browns players
Los Angeles Rams players
National Football League replacement players
USC Trojans football coaches
USC Trojans football players
All-American college football players
College Football Hall of Fame inductees
Heisman Trophy winners
National Conference Pro Bowl players
San Fernando High School alumni
Players of American football from Los Angeles
Track and field athletes from California
Sports coaches from Los Angeles
Ed Block Courage Award recipients
Deaths from liver cancer